Emberá-Wounaan is a comarca indígena (indigenous territory) in eastern Panama. It was created by Law Number 22 on November 8, 1983, out of the former Chepigana and Pinogana districts of the Darién Province. Its capital is Unión Chocó, and it is notable for being composed of two non-contiguous sections.

Administrative divisions
Emberá-Wounaan Comarca is sub-divided into 2 districts and 5 corregimientos. Cemaco is the eastern section, Sambú is the western one.

See also
Embera-Wounaan, indigenous peoples of Colombia and Panama
Emberá languages, indigenous language family in Colombia and Panama

References

 
Comarcas of Panama
States and territories established in 1983
1983 establishments in Panama